Blue Star Chios, formerly Nissos Chios, is a high-speed ro-pax ferry of Blue Star Ferries, built, along with its sister ship Blue Star Mykonos, at Elefsis Shipyards. It was an old wish of Gerasimos Strintzis. In February 2006 the first pieces of the ship were loaded at Skararamangas and were transported to Elefsis Shipyards and on November 15, 2006, construction was launched at Elefsis Shipyards. It was delivered in June 2007 for Hellenic Seaways. Its construction was completed in a very short time.

The original name of the ship means in Greek "Island of Chios", which is one of the islands of the North Aegean. It was, when launched, the newest Greek ship with frequent travels. In January 2020 the Nissos Chios was renamed Blue Star Chios together with its sister ship Nissos Mykonos, which was renamed Blue Star Mykonos, after the ships changed service from Hellenic Seaways to Blue Star Ferries.

There was a 1967-built Greek passenger-car ferry with the same name. The old Nissos Chios was scrapped in 2006.

Routes
Sailing from Piraeus the ship serves several Cyclades' islands within Blue Star's COVID caused reduced schedule.

References

External links

Ferries of Greece
Ships built in Greece
2006 ships
Ships of Blue Star Ferries